Justice Powell refers to Lewis F. Powell Jr., associate justice of the United States Supreme Court. 

Justice Powell or Judge Powell may also refer to:

People
Cleo Powell, associate justice of the Supreme Court of Virginia
Richard H. Powell, associate justice of the Arkansas Supreme Court
William Dummer Powell, chief justice of Upper Canada

Characters
 Judge Powell, a fictional character from the 1964 drama film One Potato, Two Potato (film)

See also

 Powell (surname)
 Powell (disambiguation)
 Justice (disambiguation)
 Judge (disambiguation)